Princess Maria Henrietta of Naples and Sicily (31 July 1787 – 10 September 1792) was a member of the House of Bourbon and a princess of the Kingdom of the Two Sicilies. She was a daughter of Ferdinand I of the Two Sicilies and his first wife, Maria Carolina.

Childhood
Maria Henrietta was born at the Palace of Caserta in Naples to Ferdinand, Duke of Calabria, the third son of Charles III of Spain, and to Archduchess Maria Carolina of Austria, daughter Maria Theresa of Austria and her husband, Francis I, Holy Roman Emperor. She was baptized with the name Maria Enrichetta Carmel.

Death
Maria Henrietta caught smallpox in 1789 and, allegedly, again in September 1792.

Ancestry

1787 births
1792 deaths
House of Bourbon-Two Sicilies
Sicilian princesses
18th-century Neapolitan people
Italian Roman Catholics
18th-century Roman Catholics
Burials at the Basilica of Santa Chiara
Royalty and nobility who died as children
Daughters of kings